Coconut may refer to the coconut palm (Cocos nucifera), or to its fruit or the seed within its fruit.

Coconut may also refer to:

Music
 Señor Coconut, stage name of Uwe Schmidt (b, 1968), German composer, musician and producer of electronic music
 The Cocoanuts (musical), a 1925 musical
 Coconut Records, German record label
 Coconut Records (musician), American indie-pop project

Albums
 Coconut (album), by London-based band Archie Bronson Outfit
 Coconuts (album), an album by Jane

Songs
 "Coconut" (song), a 1971 novelty song by Harry Nilsson
 "Coconut", a 1995 instrumental song by Raffi from his Raffi Radio album
 "Coconuts" (song), a 2021 song by Kim Petras
 "Coconut Tree" (song), a 2011 song by Mohombi

Film and television
 The Cocoanuts (1929), Marx Brothers film based on the musical
 Cocoanut (film), a 1939 French-German comedy drama film
 Coconuts, a character from the animated Adventures of Sonic the Hedgehog series
 "Coconuts" (Foster's Home for Imaginary Friends), a 2007 short cartoon from Foster's Home for Imaginary Friends

Other
 Coconut (slur), a betrayal of race or culture by implying that, like a coconut, a person is brown on the outside but white on the inside
Coconuts, Queensland, a locality in the Cassowary Coast Region, Australia
 COCONUT98 (Cipher Organized with Cute Operations and N-Universal Transformation), a block cipher
 Coconuts Media, a multi-national media company across Asia that publishes local city news and features websites and documentary videos
 Coconut Airways, airline featured in the 1975 hit song "Barbados"

See also
 Coconut Island (disambiguation)